Michael Panopoulos (born 9 October 1976), also written Michalis Panopoulos, is a Greek Australian association football player. He has currently retired from playing, but now coaches the Altona City U12/U13 boys team and also the state of Victoria.

Panopoulos' parents come from the Greek Macedonian village of Kratero in Florina, Greece. He began his career as a youth player with Heidelberg United in Australia, though in 1993 he was offered a professional contract with Aris Thessaloniki F.C. in the Greek Super League. Whilst at the Greek club Panopoulos played in the UEFA cup and was a losing finalist in the Greek Football Cup.

Strong performances by Panopoulos for the Greek club led to a £750,000 transfer to Portsmouth F.C. in August 1999. Panopoulos spent three years at Portsmouth, but left the club the year before Portsmouth's promotion to the FA Premier League.

In December 2001 Panopoulos moved on loan from Portsmouth to Dunfermline F.C. in the Scottish Premier League. After leaving Portsmouth he transferred to South Melbourne FC and then made a return to Greece with Kerkyra F.C. That was followed by a move back to Australia, with Oakleigh Cannons of the Victorian Premier League.

Panopoulos played for the Greece under-21 national team.

References

External links

Australian soccer players
Australian expatriate soccer players
Aris Thessaloniki F.C. players
Dunfermline Athletic F.C. players
A.O. Kerkyra players
Portsmouth F.C. players
South Melbourne FC players
Scottish Premier League players
Expatriate footballers in England
Expatriate footballers in Scotland
1976 births
Living people
Greece under-21 international footballers
Dundee United F.C. players
Association football midfielders
Soccer players from Melbourne
Australian expatriate sportspeople in England
Australian expatriate sportspeople in Scotland
Greek expatriate sportspeople in England
Greek expatriate sportspeople in Scotland
Greek expatriate footballers